Phyllis is a feminine given name which may refer to:

People
 Phyllis Bartholomew (1914–2002), English long jumper
 Phyllis Drummond Bethune (née Sharpe, 1899–1982), New Zealand artist
 Phyllis Calvert (1915–2002), British actress
 Phyllis M. Christian (born 1956), Ghanaian lawyer and consultant
 Phyllis Coates (born 1927), American actress
 Phyllis Diller (1917–2012), American actress/comedian
 Phyllis Dillon (1944–2004), Jamaican rocksteady and reggae singer
 Phyllis Eisenstein (1946–2020), American writer
 Phyllis Gotlieb (1926–2009), Canadian writer
 Phyllis Hyman (1949–1995), American jazz singer
 Phylis Lee Isley, birth name of Jennifer Jones (1919–2009), American film actress
 P. D. James (1920–2014), English crime fiction writer
 Phyllis Logan (born 1956), Scottish actress
 Phyllis Newman (1933–2019), American actress
 Phyllis Pearsall (1906–1996), British creator of the A to Z map of London
 Phyllis Quek (born 1973), Malaysian-based Singaporean actress
 Phyllis Schlafly (1924–2016), American writer and conservative activist
 Phyllis Smith (born 1951), American actress
 Phyllis Somerville (1943–2020), American actress
 Phyllis Taloikwai, senior government official in the Solomon Islands
 Phyllis Thaxter (1919–2012), American actress
 Phyllis The Housewife, a female wrestler from Gorgeous Ladies of Wrestling
 Phyllis A. Whitney (1903–2008), American mystery writer

Mythological and legendary characters
 The title character of the tale of Phyllis and Aristotle in medieval legend
 Phyllis (mythology), wife of Demophon, king of Athens
 Phyllis (river god)
 Phyllis, consort of Ereuthalion
 Phyllis, mother of the Trojan Alcaeus

Fictional characters
 Phyllis Dietrichson, in James Cain's novella Double Indemnity and two film adaptations
 Phyllis Lindstrom, on The Mary Tyler Moore Show and  Phyllis, a 1970s TV spin-off, played by Cloris Leachman.
 Phyllis Pearce, a fictional character from the British soap opera Coronation Street, played by Jill Summers.
 Phyllis Summers Newman, on The Young and the Restless
 Phyllis Vance (née Lapin), on The Office played by Phyllis Smith.
 Phyllis (Passions), a minor character on Passions

Feminine given names
Greek feminine given names